Dunlap Creek is a stream located entirely within Tuscarawas County, Ohio. It is a tributary of the Tuscarawas River.

Dunlap Creek was named for a pioneer who settled there.

See also
List of rivers of Ohio

References

Rivers of Tuscarawas County, Ohio
Rivers of Ohio